KNPP may refer to:
Karenni National Progressive Party, a Karenni political association in Myanmar
Kudankulam Nuclear Power Plant, a nuclear power station located in India